Wesley McDonald may refer to:

Wesley L. McDonald (1924–2009), U.S. Navy officer
W. Wesley McDonald (1946–2014), American academic
Wes McDonald (born 1997), English footballer for Morecambe